Borgo Pace is a comune (municipality) in the Province of Pesaro e Urbino in the Italian region Marche, located about  west of Ancona and about  southwest of Pesaro.

References

External links
 

Cities and towns in the Marche